Andrew James Russell (born 21 November 1987), is an English-born Hong Kong professional footballer who currently plays as a centre back for Hong Kong Premier League club Kitchee. He also plays for the Hong Kong national team.

Club career
In 2008, Russell signed his first contract as a professional footballer for Happy Valley, which played in Hong Kong First Division. After returning to the UK, Russell joined Mossley in the NPL First Division North and found employment with sportswear giants Adidas. In his debut season with the club he would represent them 46 times and score two goals. He joined Chorley in 2010 when manager Garry Flitcroft took over. For the 2013–14 season, Russell chose AFC Fylde after being convinced by manager Dave Challinor. He helped the club retain the Lancashire FA Challenge Trophy by beating Chorley 4–1 with one goal and one assist.

In July 2014, Russell announced on his Twitter account that he had signed for Hong Kong Premier League club South China for the 2014–15 season.

On 7 January 2017, Russell left South China for Malaysian Super League club Penang after signing a one-year contract with the club. In May 2017, Russell's contract with Penang was terminated due to poor performances.

On 27 February 2018, Russell left Tai Po, where he had played the previous half-year, for China League One club Liaoning Whowin at a six figure fee, where he could play as a native player.

On 25 February 2019, Russell signed with Chinese Super League club Hebei China Fortune.

On 16 July 2020, Russell joined China League One club Jiangxi Liansheng on loan.

In April 2021, Russell joined Jiangxi Beidamen.

In April 2022, Russell joined Sichuan Jiuniu.

On 8 February 2023, Russell returned to Hong Kong and joined Kitchee.

International career
On 14 March 2016, Russell received his first call-up for Hong Kong in preparation for the 2018 FIFA World Cup qualification match against Qatar on 24 March 2016. He made his international debut in a 2–0 loss to Qatar.

Personal life
Russell was born in Southampton, England and moved to Hong Kong with his parents when he was 18 months old. He returned to England to attend the University of Manchester.

Russell married his wife Helen in 2018. The couple has a son named Zachary.

Career statistics

Club
.

International

References

External links

 
 

1987 births
Living people
Hong Kong footballers
Hong Kong international footballers
English footballers
Footballers from Southampton
English emigrants to Hong Kong
Expatriate footballers in Hong Kong
Happy Valley AA players
Mossley A.F.C. players
Chorley F.C. players
AFC Fylde players
South China AA players
Tai Po FC players
Liaoning F.C. players
Hebei F.C. players
Jiangxi Beidamen F.C. players
Sichuan Jiuniu F.C. players
Kitchee SC players
Hong Kong First Division League players
Hong Kong Premier League players
Malaysia Super League players
China League One players
Chinese Super League players
Association football defenders
Association football central defenders
Naturalized footballers of Hong Kong
Hong Kong expatriate footballers
Hong Kong expatriate sportspeople in China
Hong Kong League XI representative players